This is an incomplete list of compositions by Louis Spohr (1784–1859). The list is divided into works given an opus number by the composer and those that were not (WoO).

With opus number
 Violin Concerto No. 1, Op. 1 (1802)
 Violin Concerto No. 2, Op. 2 (1804)
 3 Concertant Duos for 2 Violins, Op. 3
 2 String Quartets, Op. 4 (nos. 1, 2) (1805)
 Potpourri No. 1 for Violin & String Trio, Op. 5 (1832)
 Violin Concerto No. 3, Op. 7 (1805)
 2 Concertant Duos for 2 Violins, Op. 9 (1808)
 Violin Concerto No. 4, Op. 10 (1805)
Allegro moderato
Adagio
Rondo. Allegretto
 String Quartet, Op. 11 Quatuor Brillant No. 1 (1806)
Allegro moderato
Adagio
Rondo
 Overture in C minor, Op. 12
 Duet for Violin and Viola, Op. 13
 String Quartet, Op. 15 (nos. 1, 2)
 Violin Concerto No. 5, Op. 17
 Symphony No. 1 in E-flat major, Op. 20
 Alruna, die Eulenkönigin (Overture), Op. 21
 Potpourri No. 2 in B-flat major on themes by Mozart for Violin & String Quartet (with Bass ad libitum), Op. 22
 Potpourri No. 3 in G major on themes by Mozart for Violin & Orchestra, Op. 23
 Potpourri No. 4 in B major on Don Giovanni and Die Entführung aus dem Serail by Mozart for String Quartet, Op. 24
 6 Songs, Op. 25
 Clarinet Concerto No. 1 in C minor, Op. 26
 String Quartet, Op. 27
 Violin Concerto No. 6, Op. 28
 String Quartets, Op. 29 (nos. 1–3)
 String Quartet, Op. 30
 Nonet, Op. 31
 Octet, Op. 32
 2 String Quintets, Op. 33
 Notturno, Op. 34
 Fantasie in C minor for solo harp, Op. 35
 Variations sur 'Je suis encore dans mon printemps', Op. 36
 5 Songs, Op. 37
 Violin Concerto No. 7, Op. 38
 3 Grand Duos for 2 Violins, Op. 39
 Grand polonaise, Op. 40
 6 Songs, Op. 41
 String Quartet, Op. 43
 Motet "Rastlose Liebe" for male voice choir (Goethe), Op.44 no.2
 3 String Quartets, Op. 45 (nos. 1–3)
 Violin Concerto No. 8, Op. 47
 Symphonie Concertante No. 1, Op. 48
 Symphony No. 2 in D minor, Op. 49
 Quintet for flute, clarinet, horn, bassoon and piano, Op. 52
 Piano Quintet No. 1, Op. 53
 Mass in C minor, Op. 54
 Violin Concerto No. 9, Op. 55
 Clarinet Concerto No. 2 in E-flat major, Op. 57
 String Quartets, Op. 58 (nos. 1–3)
 Potpourri über irische Themen, Op. 59
 Overture, Faust, Op. 60
 String Quartet, Op. 61
 Violin Concerto No. 10, Op. 62
 Overture, Jessonda, Op. 63
 Double Quartet No. 1, Op. 65
 3 Concertant Duos for 2 Violins, Op. 67
 String Quartet, Op. 68
 String Quintet No. 3, Op. 69
 Violin Concerto No. 11, Op. 70
 6 Songs, Op. 71
 String Quartets, Op. 74 (nos. 1–3)
 Double Quartet No. 2, Op. 77
 Symphony No. 3 in C minor, Op. 78
 Violin Concerto No. 12, Op. 79
 Potpourri for Clarinet and Orchestra in F major, Op. 80
 Fantasy and Variations for Clarinet and String Quintet, Op. 81
 String Quartets, Op. 82 (nos. 1–3)
 String Quartet, Op. 83
 String Quartets, Op. 84 (nos. 1–3)
 Three Psalms, Op. 85 (No.1 - ?; No.2 - Ps. 23 "Gott ist mein Hirt"; No.3 - Ps. 130 "Aus der Tiefen")
 Symphony No. 4 in F major "Die Weihe der Töne", Op. 86
 Double Quartet No. 3, Op. 87
 Concertante No. 2 for 2 Violins and Orchestra, Op. 88
 Waltz "a la Strauss" for orchestra "Erinnerung an Marienbad" in A major, Op. 89
 String Quintet No. 4, Op. 91
 Violin Concerto No. 13 in E major, Op. 92
 String Quartet, Op. 93
 Psalm 24 for Mixed Chorus, "Jehova ist die Erds", Op.97a
 Gott, du bist gross, cantata, Op. 98
 Lieder pour voix et piano à quatre mains, Op. 101
 Symphony No. 5 in C minor, Op. 102
 Sechs Deutsche Lieder (Six German Songs) Op. 103
 String Quintet No. 5, Op. 106 (1840)
 Violin Concerto No. 14 in A minor, Op. 110 (1839)
 Sonate Concertante, Op. 113
 Symphony No. 6 in G major "Historical Symphony", Op. 116
 Fantaisie sur des thèmes de Haendel et Abbé Vogler, Op. 118
 Piano Trio No. 1, Op. 119
 Symphony No. 7 in C major "The earthly and divine in human life", Op 121
 Piano Trio No. 2, Op. 123
 Piano Trio No. 3, Op. 124
 Piano Sonata, Op. 125
Concert Overture "Im ernsten stil" Op. 126
 Violin Concerto No. 15, Op. 128
 String Quintet No. 6, Op. 129
 Piano Quintet No. 2, Op. 130
 String Quartet Concerto in A minor, Op. 131
 String Quartet No. 31 in A major, Op. 132
 Piano Trio No. 4, Op. 133
 Psalm 84, "Wie lieblich ist dein heilig Haus", 4 soli, chorus, orch., Op. 134
 6 Salonstücke, Op. 135
 Double Quartet No. 4, Op. 136
 Symphony No. 8 in G major, Op. 137
 String Sextet, Op. 140
 String Quartet, Op. 141
 Piano Trio No. 5, Op. 142
 Symphony No. 9 in B minor "The Seasons", Op. 143
 String Quintet No. 7, Op. 144
 6 Salonstücke, Op. 145
 String Quartet, Op. 146
 Septet, Op. 147
 Duo for 2 Violins, Op. 148
 Rondoletto in G major, Op. 149
 Duo for 2 Violins, Op. 150
 String Quartet, Op. 152
 Duo for 2 Violins, Op. 153
 6 Songs, Op. 154

Without opus number
 Grand Concert Overture in F major, WoO 1
 Fackeltanz in D major (lost), WoO 2
  in D major, WoO 3
 Introductory Music to Act 3 of "Die Belagerung Missolunghis" (lost), WoO 4
 Introduzione in D major, WoO 5
 Die Tochter der Luft (Phantasie in the form of a concert overture), WoO 6
 Overture to "Der Matrose", WoO 7
 Symphony in E-flat major, WoO 8 – Referred to as No. 10; composed in 1857 but withheld by the composer.
 Violin Concerto in G major, WoO 9
 Violin Concerto in E minor, WoO 10
 Concertante for Violin, Cello, and Orchestra in C major, WoO 11
 Violin Concerto in A major, WoO 12
 Concertante for Violin and Harp in G major, WoO 13
 Concertante for Violin and Harp in E minor, WoO 14
 Variations on "" in B-flat major, WoO 15, from the opera Alruna, WoO 49
 Violin Concerto Movement in D Major, WoO 16
 (unknown), WoO 17
 Variations for Violin and Orchestra in A major, WoO 18
 Clarinet Concerto No. 3 in F minor, WoO 19
 Clarinet Concerto No. 4 in E minor, WoO 20
 Sonata for Violin and Harp, WoO 23
 Adagio for Violin and Piano, WoO 35
 String Quartet, WoO 41
 String Quartet, WoO 42
 , operetta in one act, WoO 48 (1806)
 Alruna, Grand Romantische Oper in three acts, WoO 49 (1808)
 , opera in three acts, WoO 50 (1810)
 Faust, Romantische Oper in two acts, WoO 51 (1813; revised with recitativos in 1852, WoO 51a)
 , Romantische Oper in two acts, WoO 52 (1818/19)
 Jessonda, grand opera in three acts, WoO 53 (1822)
 , Romantische Oper in three acts, WoO 54 (1824)
 , Romantische Oper in two acts, WoO 56 (1827)
 , Romantische Oper in three acts, WoO 57 (1829/30)
 , Grand Opera in three acts, WoO 59 (1843/44)
 |Die letzten Dinge, WoO 61 (translated by Edward Taylor as The Last Judgement)
 Des Heilands letzte Stunden, WoO 62
 Overture, Der Fall Babylons, WoO 63
 Overture, Das befreite Deutschland, WoO 64
 Vater Unser, WoO 67
 Lied des verlassen Mädchens, WoO 90
 Nachgefühl, WoO 91
 Violin Études
 Motet: Das Lied (Wie ein stolzer Adler) for male voice choir, 1855
 Hymn "Who are these arrayed in white?" for male voice choir, date unknown

References

Bibliography
IMSLP: Free Sheet Music PDF Download. ismlp.

External links
 

Spohr, Louis